Cross-entropy benchmarking (also referred to as XEB) is quantum benchmarking protocol which can be used to demonstrate quantum supremacy.  In XEB, a random quantum circuit is executed on a quantum computer multiple times in order to collect a set of  samples in the form of bitstrings . The bitstrings are then used to calculate the cross-entropy benchmark fidelity via a  classical computer, given by 
,
If , the samples were collected from a noiseless quantum computer. If , then the samples could have been obtained via random guessing. This means that if a quantum computer did generate those samples, then the quantum computer is too noisy and thus has no chance of performing beyond-classical computations. Since it takes an exponential amount of resources to classically simulate a quantum circuit, there comes a point when the biggest supercomputer that runs the best classical algorithm for simulating quantum circuits can't compute the XEB. Crossing this point is known as achieving quantum supremacy; and after entering the quantum supremacy regime, XEB can only be estimated. 

The Sycamore processor was the first to demonstrate quantum supremacy via XEB. Generating samples took 200 seconds on the quantum processor when it would have taken 10,000 years on Summit at the time of the experiment. Improvements in classical algorithms have shortened the runtime to about a week on Sunway TaihuLight thus collapsing Sycamore's claim to quantum supremacy. It takes around 4 hours to generate samples on Zuchonzhi 2.1 when it would take 10,000 years on Sunway.

See also 

 Boson sampling

References 

Quantum information science
Quantum computing